Bruvno is a village in Croatia.

Population

According to the 2011 census, Bruvno had 92 inhabitants.

History 

Napomena: In 1857 include part of data for the settlement of Rudopolje Bruvanjsko.

1991 census

According to the 1991 census, settlement of Bruvno had 292 inhabitants, which were ethnically declared as this:

Austro-hungarian 1910 census

According to the 1910 census, settlement of Bruvno had 1,379 inhabitants in 8 hamlets, which were linguistically and religiously declared as this:

1712–14 census
The 1712–14 census of Lika and Krbava registered 658 inhabitants, all of whom were Serbian Orthodox.

Literature 

  Savezni zavod za statistiku i evidenciju FNRJ i SFRJ, popis stanovništva 1948, 1953, 1961, 1971, 1981. i 1991. godine.
 Knjiga: "Narodnosni i vjerski sastav stanovništva Hrvatske, 1880–1991: po naseljima, author: Jakov Gelo, izdavač: Državni zavod za statistiku Republike Hrvatske, 1998., ;

References

External links

Populated places in Zadar County
Lika
Serb communities in Croatia